Jacob Epstein (1880–1959) was an  American-British sculptor.

Jacob or Jake Epstein may also refer to:

Jacob Epstein (art collector) (1864–1945), Lithuanian-American merchant, philanthropist, and art collector
Jacob Epstein (banker) (1771–1843), Polish banker
Jacob Epstein (spy) (1903–1998), Russian-American student and alleged Soviet agent
Jake Epstein, Canadian actor
Jacob Epstein (writer)